Deh Molla (also Romanized as Deh Mollā) is a village in Piveh Zhan Rural District, Ahmadabad District, Mashhad County, Razavi Khorasan Province, Iran. At the 2006 census, its population was 65, in 19 families.

References 

Populated places in Mashhad County